Aberdeen Wanderers Rugby Football Club is a Scottish rugby union club. It was founded in Aberdeen in 1928 as Aberdeen Engineers RFC, acquiring its current name in 1934.

Its most notable player to date is Jason White who started with the club and progressed to captain Scotland.

History

The club merged with Aberdeen Academicals in 1971. For a time they were called Aberdeen Wanderer-Academicals.

Location 
The club is based at Groats Road, by Hazlehead Park in Aberdeen where is currently has one pitch and a pavilion called "The Jason White Pavilion"

Youth Section 
The Youth section, which was formed in 1992, has a large member base and currently fields teams from Under 13s to Under 18s and for primary aged children. An under 15s and Under 18s girls section was started in 2015, the first in Aberdeen city.

2016/17 Season 
The 1st XV were promoted into the Caledonia League Division 1 at the beginning of the season where team came 8th in the league.

The 2nd XV, known as the Aberdeen Wanderers Warriors development squad, were promoted into the Caledonia League Division 3 North League after the collapse of Division 4 at the start of the season. The Warriors finished 6th in the league.

In Scottish Rugby's Club Youth Red Conference League, the Under 13 to Under 18 teams at Aberdeen Wanderers teamed up with Deeside RFC and played as "Deeside Wanderers". The youth section came 2nd in the Conference overall.

For the Caledonia Youth Regional Competition, Aberdeen Wanderers Under 15s, Under 16s and Under 18s, combined with Aberdeen Grammar Rugby players to form a combined team called "Granite City Colts". The Under 15s and Under 18s teams got through to the semi final of their cup competitions, where the Under 16s won the Plate in their age group of the competition.

The Under 15 and Under 18 girls combined with other North East Scotland rugby clubs to enter the National Girls Cup Competition as "Grampian Girls Rugby", which saw the Under 15s get to the Cup semi final and the Under 18s to the Shield semi final. Both of these semi final games were played at Aberdeen Wanderers home ground.

Sevens tournament

The club run the Sam Lobban Trophy sevens tournament annually since 2018. It is a charity rugby sevens event in memory of their former player. Proceeds go to Mental Health Aberdeen.

References

External links
 aberdeenwanderers.com

Scottish rugby union teams
Sports teams in Aberdeen
1934 establishments in Scotland
Rugby clubs established in 1934